Nephelium chryseum is a species of plant related to the rambutan. The plant produces edible fruit that are covered in hard red shells with spikey spines. It is native to southern China, Borneo, the Philippines, and Vietnam.

External links
 Nephelium chryseum info

chryseum
Edible fruits